Stigmoplusia is a genus of moths of the family Noctuidae.

Species
 Stigmoplusia acalypta Dufay, 1972
 Stigmoplusia allocota Dufay, 1972
 Stigmoplusia antsalova Dufay, 1968
 Stigmoplusia chalcoides Dufay, 1968
 Stigmoplusia epistilba Dufay, 1972
 Stigmoplusia megista Dufay, 1975
 Stigmoplusia paraplesia Dufay, 1972

References
 Natural History Museum Lepidoptera genus database
 Stigmoplusia at funet.fi

Plusiinae